ZFSP-FM, or GOLD 94.9 (94.9 FM), is a radio station in the Cayman Islands in the British West Indies. The station's license was issued on 15 December 2004, The station, originally owned by Paramount Media Services, aired a dance music format. "Spin 94.9," as it was originally named, often featured disc jockeys that also entertained in nightclubs across the Cayman Islands.

On February, 2016 ZFSP became Bob 94.9 and changed their format to oldies. Currently, Compass Media owns the station along with 3 others.

References

Radio stations in the Cayman Islands
Radio stations established in 2004
2004 establishments in the Cayman Islands